A Pair of Kings may refer to:

 A Pair of Kings (album), a 2002 album by Riders in the Sky
 A Pair of Kings (film), a 1922 American silent comedy film

See also
 Pair of Kings, an American television sitcom